Padraig Reynolds is a writer and director, known for his horror films Open 24 Hours, Dark Light, The Devil's Dolls and Rites of Spring.

Filmography

References

External links
 

Horror film directors
Living people
Year of birth missing (living people)